Edward Arthur Brandt (February 17, 1905 – November 2, 1944) was a pitcher in Major League Baseball from 1928 to 1938. He played for the Boston Braves, Brooklyn Dodgers, and Pittsburgh Pirates.

Brandt started his professional baseball career with the Pacific Coast League's Seattle Indians. In 1927, he went 19–11 with a 3.97 earned run average. He joined the Boston Braves in 1928. From 1931 to 1934, he led the team in innings pitched each season and also won over 15 games each season. Following the team's disastrous 1935 season, Brandt was traded to the Dodgers. He retired in 1939.

Brandt was a competent hitting pitcher in his major league career. He posted a .236 batting average (187-for-793) with 80 runs, 59 RBI and 55 bases on balls. He was used as a pinch hitter 12 times in his career. Defensively, he was better than average, recording a .977 fielding percentage which was 17 points higher than the league average at his position.

After his retirement, Brandt operated a hunting lodge and also owned a tavern. He was killed on November 2, 1944, when he was struck by a car while crossing a street. He is buried at the Fairmount Memorial Park in Spokane, Washington.

See also
 List of Boston and Milwaukee Braves Opening Day starting pitchers

References

External links

1905 births
1944 deaths
Major League Baseball pitchers
Baseball players from Washington (state)
Boston Braves players
Brooklyn Dodgers players
Pittsburgh Pirates players
Seattle Indians players
Hollywood Stars players
Pedestrian road incident deaths
Road incident deaths in Washington (state)